The Stadium Scholarship Program is a cooperative program originally housed in residence quarters in the west side of Ohio Stadium - thus the name. Students participate in residence hall activities, leadership positions, community service projects, relationships with alumni, and the cooperative work program.

Cooperative Work Program
One of the fundamental aspects of the Stadium Scholarship Program is the cooperative work program. Students work 5–7 hours a week, or 50–70 hours a quarter in the hall in exchange for the reduced discount housing fees received at the beginning of every quarter. Hours are flexible around class and exam schedules.

History

Origins
The concept was the brainchild of Joseph A. Park, who was the university's dean of men at the time. Park noticed that many Ohio high school students weren't going to college because they could not afford it. In 1933, a group of 75 young male students with limited financial means moved into the Ohio Stadium. Those young men lived in barrack-like conditions in the stadium's southwest corner, which would become known as the Tower Club. In exchange for a break on rent, the young men did all the chores in the no-frills dorm, except cooking, while they attended classes at Ohio State University.

In subsequent years, the dorm expanded along the west side of the stadium and additional names, such as Buckeye and Tower clubs, were placed on the living quarters. Through the years, the unique dorm gained national attention. First Lady Eleanor Roosevelt even visited the student living quarters housed in the Horseshoe. And, in more recent history, the dorm was featured several times during nationally televised OSU football games.

Departure from Ohio Stadium
In 1975, the program and the Stadium dormitory were expanded several times. The university completed a multimillion-dollar renovation in the mid-1980s resulting in a residence hall that housed approximately 360 students. In the late 1990s, the university sought to expand and renovate Ohio Stadium. The decision was made to move the Stadium Scholarship Program to Mack Hall. The program later moved to Scholars House East and Scholars House West on Tenth Avenue.

External links
 Ohio State University Housing - Stadium Scholarship Program
 Student-run Program website
 Stadium Scholarship Dorm Alumni Society (SSDAS)

Stadium Scholarship Program